Bush Doctors is a seven-part Australian reality television series centred on the lives of a medical team at a rural hospital in Dubbo, New South Wales. It debuted on the Seven Network on 3 February 2008 and was narrated by All Saints star Jolene Anderson.

This was her last show on channel 7 and she moved to Channel 10 to star in Rush.

References

External links 
 

Seven Network original programming
Australian medical television series
Australian factual television series
Television shows set in New South Wales
2008 Australian television series debuts
2008 Australian television series endings